John Tyler Varga (born September 24, 1993) is a dual Finnish-Canadian former professional American football fullback. He was signed by the Indianapolis Colts as an undrafted free agent on May 5, 2015. Varga played college football at University of Western Ontario (2011), where he was named the OUA Rookie of the Year, and Yale (2012–2014).

Early life 
Varga was born in Stockholm, Sweden. His mother Hannele Sundberg is originally from Vantaa, Finland, and his father John Varga is of Croatian descent.

College career 

Varga attended the University of Western Ontario for one season in 2011 where he was named team MVP, conference player of the year and Canadian Interuniversity Sport (CIS) National Freshman of the Year.

Before the 2012 season, Varga transferred to Yale University and played there for the rest of his college career. He finished at Yale as a three-time All-Ivy honoree with 529 rushing attempts (ranked 5th in Yale history), 2,985 rushing yards (ranked 4th), 5.6 yards per carry (ranked 2nd), and 31 rushing touchdowns (ranked 3rd). Following Varga's senior performance, he was awarded the Bushnell Cup, which honours the Ivy League Player of the Year. He graduated in 2015 with a degree in ecology and evolutionary biology.

Professional career
Varga signed as an undrafted free agent with the Indianapolis Colts, he made the 53-man roster and was active for the Colts first game of the year against the Buffalo Bills. Varga suffered a concussion in the Colts win against the Tennessee Titans on September 27, 2015 and was placed season-ending injury reserve on October 14, 2015. On July 26, 2016, Varga retired from the NFL.

Statistics

References

External links
 Indianapolis Colts bio
 Yale Bulldogs bio

1993 births
Living people
Canadian football running backs
American football running backs
Finnish players of American football
Canadian players of American football
Indianapolis Colts players
Western Mustangs football players
Canadian people of Finnish descent
Yale Bulldogs football players
Canadian people of Croatian descent
Finnish people of Croatian descent
Sportspeople from Stockholm